MES Kalladi College, is an arts and science college located in Mannarkkad, Palakkad district, Kerala. It was established in the year 1967. The college is affiliated with Calicut University. This college offers different courses in arts, commerce and science.

Accreditation
The college is  recognized by the University Grants Commission (UGC).

References

External links
http://www.meskc.ac.in

Universities and colleges in Palakkad district
Educational institutions established in 1967
1967 establishments in Kerala
Arts and Science colleges in Kerala
Colleges affiliated with the University of Calicut